is a Japanese footballer who plays for Tegevajaro Miyazaki.

Career
After three seasons with Honda Lock SC in Miyazaki, Ishii joined Kamatamare Sanuki, who then got promoted to J2 League in 2014. Unfortunately, he hasn't had too much pitch-time in Kagawa and so he signed for Tegevajaro Miyazaki in 2017, where he was fielded more than with Sanuki.

Club statistics
Updated to 23 February 2020.

References

External links

Profile at Kamatamare Sanuki

1987 births
Living people
Tokai University alumni
Association football people from Shizuoka Prefecture
Japanese footballers
J2 League players
Japan Football League players
Honda Lock SC players
Kamatamare Sanuki players
Tegevajaro Miyazaki players
Association football goalkeepers